Benoît Godin was a Canadian political scientist and sociologist.

Biography
Benoît Godin is mostly known for his research into the history of statistics, statistics of innovation, and of the ideological roots of the concept of innovation. After a first degree at the Université Laval (1984) in Québec (CA), he obtained a PhD at the Science Policy Research Unit (SPRU) the University of Sussex (UK) in 1994). From February 1993 until his death he was professor at Institut national de la recherche scientifique INRS, Québec (CA).

Work
The work of Benoît Godin covers both the history of quantification and that of innovation. He worked on measurement statistics in science, on the history of science proper, as well as that of technology and innovation. In the last years of his life he focused on the intellectual history of innovation, noting how the ‘superlative’ connotation of the term innovation is recent, in relative terms, as it had a rather negative connotation until the late 1960s or early 1970s.

Books 
 
(As editor with Dominique Vinck) Critical Studies of Innovation: Alternative Approaches to the Pro-Innovation Bias.

See also
 Innovation
 Science and technology studies
 Social construction of technology

References

External links
 Page of Benoît Godin at INRS
 Page of The Idea of Innovation, A project funded by the Canadian Social Sciences and Humanities Research Council (SSHRC).
 CASTI Network, Conceptual Approaches to Science, Technology, and Innovation: An Interdisciplinary Research Network.

Sociologists of science
Science studies
Science and technology studies scholars
Social constructionism
Sociology of scientific knowledge
21st-century Canadian philosophers
Philosophers of science
Philosophers of technology
1958 births
2021 deaths